The Kites of War is a 1969 thriller novel by the British writer Derek Lambert. It is set on the Chinese-Indian frontier, where Lambert had worked as a foreign correspondent.

References

Bibliography
 Burton, Alan. Historical Dictionary of British Spy Fiction. Rowman & Littlefield, 2016.

1969 British novels
Novels by Derek Lambert
British thriller novels